Damegunta is a village in Kodavalur mandal, situated in Nellore district of the Indian state of Andhra Pradesh.In Damegunta village population of children with age 0-6 is 122 which makes up 8.75 % of total population of village.

References 

Villages in Nellore district